Jason Dennis is a male beach volleyball player and coach from Trinidad and Tobago.

He played in the men's competition at the NORCECA Beach Volleyball Circuit 2008 partnering Colin Charles

Playing with Daymian Stewart, he participated in the National Beach Volleyball Championship 2008 and the Sizzling Sand Caribbean Beach Volleyball Tour 2008 in Antigua.

References

 

Year of birth missing (living people)
Living people
Trinidad and Tobago beach volleyball players
Men's beach volleyball players